Denis Smith (born 30 October 1991) is a Grenadian cricketer. He made his first-class debut for the Windward Islands in the 2014–15 Regional Four Day Competition on 6 March 2015. He made his List A debut for the Windward Islands in the 2018–19 Regional Super50 tournament on 3 October 2018. In October 2019, he was named in Jamaica's squad for the 2019–20 Regional Super50 tournament.

References

External links
 

1991 births
Living people
Grenadian cricketers
Jamaica cricketers
Windward Islands cricketers